Istoricheskie Zapiski (Исторические записки) (Historical Transactions), also known as ИЗ, is an academic journal of history published by Progress Publishers in Moscow for the Russian Academy of Sciences and its predecessors since 1937. The journal specialises in medieval and modern Russian history and until 1957 was one of just three journals available to Soviet historians, the others being Voprosy Istorii, which took a more historiographical approach, and Vestnik Drevnei Istorii which dealt with ancient history.

Boris Grekov was the first editor from 1937 to 1953, who was replaced by Arkadi Sidorov in 1954.

References

External links 
Istoricheskie zapiski at Hathi Trust

Russian-language journals
Publications established in 1937
European history journals
Works about Russian history